Norway did not send a team to the 1904 Summer Olympics in St. Louis, United States. However, Norwegian immigrants to America Charles Ericksen and Bernhoff Hansen took part in wrestling competitions in welterweight and heavyweight events respectively and won gold medals.

Medalists

References

Nations at the 1904 Summer Olympics